Morris is a rural municipality (RM) in the province of Manitoba in Western Canada. The Town of Morris, a separate urban municipality, is located in the southeastern corner of the RM.

The RM has a population of 3,047 persons as of the 2016 Canada Census.

Communities
 Aubigny
 Kane
 Lowe Farm
 McTavish
 Riverside
 Rosenort
 Sewell
 Silver Plains
 Sperling
 Union Point

Demographics 

External links
 Official website
 Map of Morris R.M. at Statcan

References

Morris